Hamblen Township is one of four townships in Brown County, Indiana. As of the 2010 census, its population was 4,336 and it contained 2,713 housing units.

History
Hamblen Township was named for Job Hamblen, a pioneer settler.

Geography

Unincorporated towns
 Cordry Sweetwater Lakes (census-designated place)
 Gatesville
 Peoga (partial)
 Spearsville
 Sprunica, Indiana
 Taggart
(This list is based on USGS data and may include former settlements.)

Adjacent townships
 Jackson (west)
 Washington (southwest)
 Camp Atterbury (east)
 Hensley Township, Johnson County (north)
 Nineveh Township, Johnson County (northeast)

Cemeteries
The township contains six cemeteries: Anderson, Calvin, Duncan, Mount Moriah, Taylor and Zion Church.

References
 
 United States Census Bureau cartographic boundary files

External links

 Indiana Township Association
 United Township Association of Indiana

Townships in Brown County, Indiana
Townships in Indiana